Lee Sun-kyun (born March 2, 1975) is a South Korean actor. After beginning his career in musical theatre, for many years Lee was relegated to minor and supporting roles onscreen, only getting to play lead characters in one-act dramas on KBS Drama City and MBC Best Theater. In one such Best Theater project, he worked with TV director Lee Yoon-jung on Taereung National Village (2005), which led to him being cast in her later series Coffee Prince in 2007. Coffee Prince, along with medical drama White Tower brought Lee mainstream popularity, which he followed with Pasta (2010), Golden Time (2012) and My Mister (2018).

Meanwhile, on the big screen, he received a Best Actor award from the Las Palmas de Gran Canaria International Film Festival for his role in Paju (2009), followed by critical acclaim for mystery thriller Helpless (2012), romantic comedy All About My Wife (2012), and crime/black comedy A Hard Day (2014). Lee also continues to collaborate with auteur Hong Sang-soo, and his arthouse films with Hong include Night and Day (2008), Oki's Movie (2010), and Nobody's Daughter Haewon (2013). In 2019, he starred in Bong Joon-ho's Oscar-winning black comedy film Parasite.

Career 
Lee Sun-kyun entered the Korea National University of Arts in 1994, and graduated in the first ever batch of its School of Drama. In 2001, he made his acting debut as Brad Majors in the stage musical The Rocky Horror Show.

2007–2012: Acting beginnings
Playing small supporting roles for many years, he eventually achieved his breakthrough in 2007 with the critically lauded medical drama White Tower and the highly popular romantic series Coffee Prince. Besides Coffee Prince, he has worked with director Lee Yoon-jung two other times—in the sports-themed Taereung National Village in 2005, and in slice-of-life drama Triple in 2009.

Lee was appointed as ambassador for the Health Insurance Review Agency in 2007, and won an award from the Korea Advertisers Association in 2008.

Despite his burgeoning fame, Lee then turned to low-budget arthouse films to polish his acting caliber. Night and Day, Lost in the Mountains, Oki's Movie, Nobody's Daughter Haewon and Our Sunhi were all directed by Hong Sang-soo, an auteur renowned for his realistic portrayal of ordinary lives. Lee also headlined Paju, for which he won the Best Actor award at the Las Palmas de Gran Canaria International Film Festival held in Spain. Film distributor Myung Film quoted the judging committee as handing Lee high points for portraying the anguish his character felt for loving his wife's younger sister.

With Pasta, in which he played a brilliant-but-abrasive chef, Lee successfully shook off his "gentle" TV drama image, and the series' popularity made him a bankable romantic leading man. Petty Romance reunited him with his My Sweet Seoul co-star Choi Kang-hee, and one-upmanship action comedy Officer of the Year (also known as Arrest King) soon followed.

Lee showed his support for the revival of Drama Special (formerly Drama City) by starring in Our Slightly Risque Relationship (his acting was later recognized at the KBS Drama Awards). He has continually defended the importance of the short drama format as a training ground for young talent, acknowledging its contribution to his own career.

2012–2017: Rising success
In 2012, he starred in two consecutive well-reviewed big-screen hits—mystery thriller Helpless and romantic comedy All About My Wife. Reuniting with Pasta director Kwon Seok-jang, Lee played a trauma doctor in Golden Time. His third collaboration with Kwon was Miss Korea, a drama set amidst the IMF crisis in the 1990s.

Lee returned to the theater opposite wife Jeon Hye-jin in Mike Bartlett's stage play Love, Love, Love in 2013. The following year, he headlined the film A Hard Day, which screened at the Directors' Fortnight section of the 2014 Cannes Film Festival, and became a critically acclaimed sleeper hit at the box office. In 2015, Lee starred in courtroom drama film The Advocate: A Missing Body.

2018–present: Return to television and resurgence
In 2018, Lee starred in the critically acclaimed television series My Mister. The same year he starred in the action thriller film Take Point.

In 2019, Lee is set to star in the legal television series Prosecutor Civil War. More recently, he had a starring role in the critically acclaimed film Parasite, directed by Bong Joon-ho, which became the first South Korean film to win the Palme d'Or, as well as the first to be nominated for and win the Academy Award for Best Picture. His role was Park Dong-ik (Nathan), the Park family father.

In 2021, Lee played a brain scientist trying to solve the mysterious death of his family by hacking into the brains of the deceased. Dr. Brain is the first Korean-language show produced for Apple TV+. As the drama series debut of renowned filmmaker Kim Jee-woon, sci-fi thriller is based on the Korean webtoon of the same name. For his performance He was nominated for a Best Actor award for the 50th International Emmy Awards.

In 2021, Lee is appearing in political drama film Kingmaker as political strategist. The film was released in December. He was nominated for  award for best actor in this film, however the award go to his costar Sol Kyung-gu.

Personal life 
Lee married his girlfriend of seven years, actress Jeon Hye-jin on May 23, 2009. Their agency announced that their first son was born on November 25, 2009. The couple's second son was born on August 9, 2011.

Filmography

Stage Credit

Theater

Musical

Discography

Awards and nominations

State honors

Notes

References

External links 

 
 
 

21st-century South Korean male actors
South Korean male film actors
South Korean male television actors
South Korean male musical theatre actors
South Korean male stage actors
Korea National University of Arts alumni
Outstanding Performance by a Cast in a Motion Picture Screen Actors Guild Award winners
1975 births
Living people
People from Seoul
Actresses from Seoul